The Dr. Cleveland Hollabaugh House is a historic house on Oak Street in Leslie, Arkansas.  It is a -story wood-frame structure, with a hip roof and weatherboard siding.  It is an architecturally eclectic mix of Folk Victorian and Craftsman elements, with gingerbread decoration typical of the former applied to a porch with a basically Craftsman form.  The house was built about 1910 for a doctor who primarily served railroad workers.

The house was listed on the National Register of Historic Places in 1993.

See also
National Register of Historic Places listings in Searcy County, Arkansas

References

Houses on the National Register of Historic Places in Arkansas
Houses completed in 1910
Houses in Searcy County, Arkansas
National Register of Historic Places in Searcy County, Arkansas